Virginia "Ginny" Fuchs (born March 9, 1988) is an American flyweight boxer and southpaw from Houston, Texas. She competed in the Tokyo 2020 Summer Olympics.

Early life and education
Fuchs was born in Houston, Texas. Fuchs became interested in sports at a young age and played soccer, softball, and basketball as a child. She attended Episcopal High School where she ran track and cross-country.

Her athletic abilities earned her an invitation for walk-on spot on the track and cross-country team at Louisiana State University. Fuchs graduated from LSU in 2011 with a bachelor's degree in kinesiology.

Boxing career 
Fuchs first tried boxing her sophomore year of college to stay in shape. After a coach took interest in her, she dedicated her focus to boxing in 2008. She trained for a year before her first fight, which she won.

She began to compete at the state level and won three Louisiana state Golden Gloves, and later won a national Golden Gloves title in 2015. Fuchs is a finalist for the US National Tournament for 2013, 2014, and 2015.

When it was announced that women’s boxing would be added to the 2012 Summer Olympics, Fuchs tried for a spot on the USA Boxing team, but American flyweight boxer and Olympic medalist Marlen Esparza received the only flyweight position. Fuchs finished fourth at the Olympic Test Event.

Fuchs trained for the next Olympic Test Event at Baby Bull Boxing Academy, founded by American professional boxer Juan Diaz in Houston, Texas.

In October 2015, she faced and defeated Esparza in the Olympic Test Event for the USA Boxing flyweight spot for the 2016 Summer Olympics. Fuchs has also defeated Olympic medalist and five-time world champion, Mary Kom of India. Fuchs won gold at the Olympic Trials Test Event.

Fuchs finished in third place at the 2016 American Qualification Event for AIBA. She won bronze at the 2018 AIBA world championship in India.

Fuchs won 1st in the 2016 USA Boxing Nationals defeating Marlene Esparza for the third straight time with a unanimous 5-0 decision.

In 2020, Fuchs tested positive for a banned substance, but was ruled not at fault due to contamination via unprotected sexual intercourse.

Fuchs qualified for the 2020 Tokyo Olympics, held in 2021, but was defeated in the round of 16 by Bulgarian boxer Stoyka Krasteva.

Fuchs cites Olympian and runner Steve Prefontaine as an inspiration for her athletic career. She has also received advice from professional boxer Oscar De La Hoya.

Personal life 

Fuchs is an advocate for mental health awareness and was diagnosed with obsessive compulsive disorder (OCD) at a young age. She has appeared in the PBS documentary series Mysteries of Mental Illness and the Oprah Winfrey/Apple TV documentary series The Me You Can't See.

References

External links
Boxer Ginny Fuchs Fact Checks Her Wikipedia Page at NBC New York

1988 births
Living people
American women boxers
AIBA Women's World Boxing Championships medalists
Boxers from Texas
Louisiana State University alumni
Boxers at the 2019 Pan American Games
Pan American Games silver medalists for the United States
Pan American Games medalists in boxing
Flyweight boxers
Medalists at the 2019 Pan American Games
Olympic boxers of the United States
Boxers at the 2020 Summer Olympics
21st-century American women